Posana is a village in Udaipurwati tehsil of Jhunjhunu district in the Indian state of Rajasthan.

Location 
Posana is situated at a distance of 39 km from Jhunjhunu in the south direction on Jhunjhunu-Jaipur state highway no.- 37 via Udaipurwati .

Occupation 
Main occupation of people is agriculture and government/private jobs. Some villagers are employed in government services like Dhura Ram Boyal Working as a Lecturer in Delhi,jagroop Singh Mechu in INDIAN ARMY, Rohitaswa Kumar mechu job in rajasthan police  and many people are doing private jobs in other states i.e. Andhra Pradesh, Gujarat, Delhi & Maharashtra.Naveen Dudi and Ravindra Dhewa are the 2 bloggers working in Delhi and Bangalore.

Transport 
Posana is connected to nearby villages through the road network with presence of State Transport Service and Private Bus Services which link it to Jhunjhunu, Udaipurwati, Sikar, Gudha Gorji, Nawalgarh, Neem-Ka-Thana & Khetri.

Geography 

References 

Villages in Jhunjhunu district